A khoroo is an administrative subdivision of Ulaanbaatar, the capital of Mongolia. The term is often translated as subdistrict or microdistrict, although the latter might lead to confusion with khoroolols. A khoroo is below the level of a düüreg (district).

As of 2020 there is a total of 173 khoroo. Each khoroo has an identifying number within its düüreg.

List of khoroo

References 

Districts of Ulaanbaatar
Types of administrative division